Jahmar Young (born November 18, 1986) is an American professional basketball player for Hapoel Hevel Modi'in of the Israeli National League. He played college basketball for New Mexico State.

Early life and college career
Young attended W. E. B. Du Bois High School in Baltimore, Maryland. He was rated as the No. 26 best prep recruit by hoopscooponline.com. As a youngster, he played for various AAU programs, including the DC Assault and Cecil Kirk. In 2004, Young averaged 18.3 points per game and shot 47.5 percent from the field in a four-game tournament for Cecil Kirk.

Young played college basketball at the New Mexico State University, where he averaged 20.2 points, 3.5 rebounds and 3.1 assists per game in his senior year. Young was named First-team All-WAC in 2009 and 2010.

Professional career
In September 2010, he signed his first professional contract with Crvena zvezda of Serbia. In March 2011, he left Zvezda and signed with Spirou Charleroi of Belgium. He played only 3 games in the Belgian League.

In August 2011, he signed with BK Ventspils of the Latvian Basketball League for the 2011–12 season. In August 2012 he signed with Orléans Loiret Basket of the French LNB Pro A for the 2012–13 season.

In September 2013, he signed with Nizhny Novgorod of Russia. On October 19, 2013, he was released by Nizhny after appearing in only one game. In December 2013, he signed with HKK Široki of Bosnia and Herzegovina. In April 2014, he parted ways with Široki.

In January 2015, he signed with Sporting Al Riyadi Beirut of Lebanon.

On November 27, 2015, he signed with Paris-Levallois of the LNB Pro A. On February 16, 2016, he parted ways with Paris after appearing in ten games. On February 26, 2016, he re-signed with Sporting Al Riyadi Beirut.

On October 18, 2017, Young signed with Cibona of Croatia for the rest of the 2017–18 season, but the contract was terminated on November 22 of the same year. In January 2018, he signed with Beirut Club.

On October 24, 2018, Young returned to Hapoel Haifa for a second stint, signing a one-year deal. In 26 games played during the 2018–19 season, he finished the season as the league third best scorer with 22.6 points, to go with 2.7 rebounds, 4.6 assists and 1.4 steals per game.

On January 22, 2020, Young signed with Hapoel Hevel Modi'in as an injury cover for Deondre Parks.

References

External links
 New Mexico State bio
 RealGM profile
 ABA League profile
 Eurobasket.com profile
 LNB Pro A profile

1986 births
Living people
ABA League players
African-American basketball players
American expatriate basketball people in Bosnia and Herzegovina
American expatriate basketball people in Belgium
American expatriate basketball people in Croatia
American expatriate basketball people in France
American expatriate basketball people in Israel
American expatriate basketball people in Latvia
American expatriate basketball people in Lebanon
American expatriate basketball people in Russia
American expatriate basketball people in Serbia
American expatriate basketball people in the Dominican Republic
Basketball players from Baltimore
BC Nizhny Novgorod players
BK Ventspils players
Hapoel Haifa B.C. players
Hapoel Hevel Modi'in B.C. players
HKK Široki players
KK Cibona players
KK Crvena zvezda players
Orléans Loiret Basket players
Metropolitans 92 players
Shooting guards
Spirou Charleroi players
American men's basketball players
Huracanes del Atlántico players
Al Riyadi Club Beirut basketball players
21st-century African-American sportspeople
20th-century African-American people